Saint Conran of Orkney was a 7th-century Bishop of Orkney.
His feast day is 14 February.

Monks of Ramsgate account

The monks of St Augustine's Abbey, Ramsgate wrote in their Book of Saints (1921),

Butler's account

The hagiographer Alban Butler (1710–1773) wrote in his Lives of the Fathers, Martyrs, and Other Principal Saints,

Notes

Sources

 
 

Medieval Scottish saints
7th-century deaths